Tuvirumab is a human monoclonal antibody for the treatment of patients with chronic hepatitis B. It has undergone Phase I clinical trials in 2001.

References 

Monoclonal antibodies
Experimental drugs